Covington-Sawyer-Wilderness was a Census-designated place in King County, Washington.  The CDP was disbanded in 2000 United States Census, with portions incorporated into Covington, Black Diamond,  and Maple Valley. The remainder was reassigned to Lake Morton-Berrydale CDP.  The population in 1990 was 24,321
. The census area, located in the southern end of the county, was located at 47.352810 north, 122.073107 west.

References

External links
U.S. Censu map of Covington-Sawyer-Wilderness
The Probert Encyclopaedia - Places of the World (Cn-Co)

Populated places in King County, Washington
Former census-designated places in Washington (state)